KOOV (106.9 FM) is a radio station broadcasting a Catholic ministry radio format. Licensed to Kempner, Texas, United States, it serves the Killeen-Temple area. The station is currently owned by Armor of God Catholic Radio Apostolate.  The station is an affiliate of the EWTN radio network.

External links

Radio stations established in 1978
1978 establishments in Texas
Catholic radio stations
OOV